Valenciennea strigata is a species of fish in the family Gobiidae, the gobies. Its common names include the blueband goby, golden-head sleeper goby, and pennant glider. It is native to the Indian Ocean and the western Pacific Ocean where it can be found in outer lagoons and the seaward side of reefs. It primarily inhabits burrows dug under rubble, using them as both a nesting site and a refuge from predators. Such burrows typically have two entrances; however, only one of them is open, as the other is covered by rubble, sand, and algae. It can also be found in the aquarium trade. This species can reach a length of  TL. It is the type species of the genus Valenciennea.

References

External links
Valenciennea strigata. Fishes of Australia.
 Photos of Valenciennea strigata in iNaturalist

Valenciennea
Fish described in 1782
Taxa named by Pierre Marie Auguste Broussonet